Melissa Köck (born 27 June 1997) is an Austrian female deaf alpine skier. She competed at the 2015 Winter Deaflympics and competed in the women's downhill, giant slalom, slalom, Super-G and super combined events. She is also the younger sister of fellow Austrian alpine skier, Kristina Kock.  

Melissa in her Deaflympic debut at the 2015 Winter Deaflympics, claimed four silver medals in the women's giant slalom, slalom, super combined and Super-G events as the gold medals in the relevant categories were won by Czech alpine skier, Tereza Kmochová. She also represented Austria at the 2019 Winter Deaflympics where she won three bronze medals.

References 

1997 births
Living people
Austrian female alpine skiers
Deaf skiers
Austrian deaf people
Medalists at the 2015 Winter Deaflympics
Medalists at the 2019 Winter Deaflympics
Alpine skiers at the 2015 Winter Deaflympics
Alpine skiers at the 2019 Winter Deaflympics
Deaflympic silver medalists for Austria
Deaflympic bronze medalists for Austria
Deaflympic alpine skiers of Austria
20th-century Austrian women
21st-century Austrian women